Albrighton railway station is a railway station which serves the village of Albrighton in Shropshire, England. The former up goods yard is now occupied by a small estate of low rise offices.

History
Opened by the Shrewsbury and Birmingham Railway,  it became part of the Great Western Railway, staying there during the Grouping of 1923. The line then passed on to the London Midland Region of British Railways on nationalisation in 1948.

When Sectorisation was introduced, the station was served by Regional Railways.

Refurbishment
The station is currently undergoing a refurbishment, at a cost of £1.5 million, which commenced in spring 2012. The project is supported by the local civic society and will see the listed buildings and structures restored.

Services
Albrighton is typically served Monday to Sunday by one train per hour in each direction between Birmingham New Street and Shrewsbury via Wolverhampton, with some extra trains at peak times on weekdays. These services are operated by West Midlands Trains under the 'West Midlands Railway' brand using British Rail Class 170 Diesel Multiple Units, which will be replaced by British Rail Class 196 DMUs in mid-2022.

See also
Listed buildings in Albrighton, Bridgnorth

References 

 
 
 
 Station on navigable O.S. map

Further reading

External links

Railway stations in Shropshire
DfT Category F2 stations
Former Great Western Railway stations
Railway stations in Great Britain opened in 1849
Railway stations served by West Midlands Trains
Railway stations served by Transport for Wales Rail
1849 establishments in England